D'Huison-Longueville is a commune in the Essonne department in Île-de-France in northern France.

Population
Inhabitants of D'Huison-Longueville are known as Huisonnais-Longuevillois.

See also
Communes of the Essonne department

References

External links

Mayors of Essonne Association 

Communes of Essonne